Roy Parnell (born 8 October 1943, Birkenhead) is an English footballer who played as right back for Everton, Tranmere Rovers and Bury. He was later the player/manager of New Brighton.

References

1943 births
Everton F.C. players
Tranmere Rovers F.C. players
Bury F.C. players
Living people
Sportspeople from Birkenhead
Association football fullbacks
English Football League players
English footballers
English football managers
New Brighton A.F.C. players
New Brighton A.F.C. managers